The AMC AMX/3 (alternate spelling: AMX III) is a mid-engine sports car made by the United States Automobile manufacturer American Motors Corporation (AMC), which was presented in March 1970 and was to be mass-produced in Germany by Karmann from 1971. With this car, AMC wanted to counter the similarly designed De Tomaso Pantera with a competitor. The body design and drivetrain came from AMC, the chassis and suspension were developed in Europe. The design was generally attributed to Giotto Bizzarrini. However, only individual components such as the suspension come from him. In addition to Bizzarrini, Italdesign, Autocostruzioni S.D. and BMW were also involved in the development. Shortly after the presentation, AMC abandoned the project without giving any reason after about half a dozen cars had been made. Several attempts to revive the design without AMC's involvement under the Bizzarrini brand name as the Bizzarrini Sciabola were unsuccessful. An AMX/3 chassis formed the technical basis for the Iso Varedo concept car in 1972.

Background 

The AMX/3 was created in response to business difficulties at American Motors. As the smallest of the four major US car companies, AMC had suffered significant losses in the first half of the 1960s, which was mainly explained by a technically undemanding model range often perceived as staid. Near the end of the 1960s, AMC tried to appeal to younger buyers at the end of the decade with sporty variants of volume models. Introduced for the 1968 model year, the pony car Javelin was three years late compared to the competition. The Javelin-derived two-seat hatchback AMX received good press as an early muscle car, but sold much worse than expected—possibly because of too much stylistic proximity to AMC's standard models.

To give the AMC brand a sporty image, management had been pursuing the goal of adding a high-performance sports car with a mid-engine to the model range since 1967. This was mainly triggered by the motor racing successes of the appropriately designed Ford GT40, which Ford knew how to use for advertising and which had also prompted the GM brand Chevrolet to develop the Astro II concept car. In the spring of 1968, AMC initially showed the stylistically De Tomaso Mangusta-influenced AMC AMX/2, which was purely a show car, and had no prospect of series production. This design was further developed into the AMX/3, which was already a near-production design.

In autumn 1968, the decision was made to produce the AMX/3 in series. Its primary rival was to be the De Tomaso Pantera, which was still in development at the time, of which it was already clear that Ford would distribute it in the United States through its dealer network.

After several prototypes were completed, AMC had promotional photos produced in March 1970 in front of the Colosseum in Rome. AMC presented the car to the Italian press in Rome on 23 March 1970 and to the American press in New York on 4 April 1970. Both dates were one day before the local presentation of the De Tomaso Pantera. From 5 April 1970, the AMX/3 was finally on display at the New York Auto Show, where the Pantera also made its debut. In support, Giotto Bizzarrini drove a few demonstration laps at the Michigan Speedway. However, a little later - depending on the source at the end of April or in the summer of 1970 - AMC surprisingly abandoned the AMX/3. Reasons for the termination were not given. By then, AMC had invested about US$2 million in the project.

Model designation 

The abbreviation AMX stands for American Motors Experimental (mutatis mutandis: experimental model of the American Motors Company). From 1968 onwards, AMC used it for a series-produced front-engined sports car. At the beginning of the development phase, the mid-engined coupé was given the designation AMX/3; this was also intended as the sales designation of the production model that was ultimately not realised. The 3 - for the third experimental vehicle - was typographically mostly connected with a slash. This lettering can be found on some prototypes. However, AMC deviated from this and used the styling AMX III on at least one prototype. A contemporary sketch also shows a vehicle with the lettering AMX/K, where the K stands for the body manufacturer Karmann.

History of development 
The development history of the AMC AMX/3 is not clear in all details. It started with the body design, for which a chassis and a body structure were constructed in further steps within seven months, before a test program with several prototypes was carried out. Numerous European service providers were involved in this process, three of whom were closely connected in business at the time.

Planning at AMC 
The decision to outsource the development and production of the AMX/3 to European operations was made for financial reasons. The management hoped to keep production costs and the sales price low in this way. Series production was to be undertaken by the German coachbuilder Karmann, who, in Rheine, had been assembling AMC Javelins destined for Europe since 1968 from disassembled parts kits. The schematics called for increasing production of the AMX/3 to 1,000, after an initial run of 24 cars according to other sources as many as 5,000 cars annually to be sold in both the US and Europe. Other sources suggest AMC initially made 5,000 cars a year as a production target and later reduced this to 24 cars a year. The asking price was expected to be US$10,000 to $12,000 . This was about three times the price of a contemporary Ford Mustang, While a Ferrari 365 GTB/4 "Daytona" was offered for US$19,900

AMC design center 
The AMX/3's body design was created in the spring of 1968 and was credited to AMC's own design studio, headed by Richard "Dick" Teague. The detailed work was done by Vince Geraci, Jack Kenitz, Chuck Mashigan, and Robert "Bob" Nixon. Teague suggested in later years that "a lot of work" had been outsourced to the specialist Creative Industries of Detroit during the design process, but did not specify. A clay mock-up was crafted in a design studio leased by AMC at the company's East Outer Drive facility.

In the autumn of 1968, a 1:1 model made of glass-fiber reinforced plastic, known as the Pushmobile, was created from the designs of the AMC designers. It was not roadworthy, had no engine, no steering and no interior and was held together inside by a metal framework. After its completion, it was contrasted in a design competition with an alternative proposal by Giorgio Giugiaro's Studio Italdesign, which had been created under time pressure in parallel with the Bizzarrini Manta show car and was perceived as "heavy and immature" or "unfinished and loveless". In the end, the AMC design won.

Bizzarrini and Italdesign 
Because AMC had only front-engine, rear-wheel-drive production cars in its 1960s lineup, the AMX/3, designed as a mid-engine car, could not build on existing production technology. "For lack of own know-how" AMC sought to have it designed by an external specialist, using European service providers (mainly for cost reasons). In the early planning phase, AMC considered having the AMX/3 constructed entirely by BMW, but this failed due to a lack of capacity at BMW. On Pininfarinas or Karmanns AMC then entered into an association in November 1968 with the engineer Giotto Bizzarrini, who had been building racing and sports cars for Alfa Romeo, Ferrari, A.T.S., Lamborghini, Iso and had designed his own brand and had the reputation of being one of the best automotive engineers in Italy. Bizzarrini, who had lost his business to bankruptcy a month earlier, then worked as a freelance designer for AMC. He produced the first drawings for chassis parts as early as December 1968. AMC then promoted the AMX/3 as a Bizzarrini design. However, Bizzarrini's contributions are limited to individual components of the car. Giotto Bizzarrini later stated that AMC had asked him for "a chassis and suspension". However, only the suspension is proven to be a Bizzarrini design. The frame, on the other hand, was developed by Giorgio Giugiaro's company Italdesign, which saw itself not only as a design studio but also as a construction service provider. On whose initiative Italdesign became involved, and how exactly the labor was divided with Bizzarrini, is not clear. Italdesign's involvement lasted from December 1968 to June 1969; however, AMC did not make it public.

Autocostruzioni S.D. (Diomante) 
According to one source, AMC initially commissioned the Turin coachbuilder Coggiola to build the prototypes. Coggiola began work on the first AMX/3 in late autumn 1968, but did not finish it. For unknown reasons, prototype construction was transferred at the turn of 1968/69 to the newly founded company Autofficina Salvatore Diomante, which was renamed Autocostruzioni S.D. shortly afterwards. The firm is also commonly known as Diomante. Its founder Salvatore Diomante had been plant manager at Automobili Bizzarini until 1968. Diomante was first based at the previous Bizzarrini plant in Livorno. It was here - possibly on the basis of Coggiola's preliminary work - that the first prototype of the AMX/3 was built in the spring of 1969. Diomante later moved operations to Moncalieri near Turin; all the remaining AMX/3s were built there.

BMW 
Test drives and the revision of the chassis were eventually commissioned to BMW, where the project was given the development code E18. BMW undertook test drives with the first prototype starting in June 1969 and found significant deficiencies. Thus, the chassis proved to be clearly too weakly designed so that it deformed equally under strong acceleration and strong deceleration. In addition, the straight-line running was poor and the cooling of the engine was not sufficient. Bizzarrini revised the chassis, and the cooling system was also modified. The second prototype, which was probably delivered to BMW in late summer 1969, was significantly improved in the opinion of the testers. BMW's involvement ended in January 1970 after AMC stopped funding the test program.

Unlike Italdesign's involvement, BMW's participation in the development of the AMX/3 was already explicitly thematised in the contemporary Italian and English-language press.

Technical description

Chassis and suspension 
The AMX/3 has a semi-monocoque with a central centre beam and box sills. This distinguishes it from Giotto Bizzarrini's earlier designs, many of which have a tube frame. All wheels have independent suspension on double wishbones. The rear lower wishbones are trapezoidal, and the wheel carriers (stub axle and hub plate) are cast from aluminium. Each wheel has coil springs and telescopic shock absorbers; the rear tires each have dual coil-over shocks. The shock absorbers were built by the Dutch manufacturer Koni according to Bizzarrini's specifications. The brake system with four disc brakes came from Girling according to Bizzarrini's original conception, but was replaced by one from ATE after the first tests at BMW in the summer of 1969. The weight distribution is 43:57. The front tires are specified as 205/70 VR 15, and the rear tires as 225/70 VR 15.

Body 

The handcrafted sheet steel hatchback body is joined to the floor pan to form a self-supporting unibody.

The design of the AMX/3 is described as "dramatic" The most striking design details are the profiled fenders and the pronounced sweep over the rear wheels. The AMC designers took the basic idea for this from the Studio GT, a prototype designed by the Italian coachbuilder Neri e Bonacini in 1966 and first shown in 1968. He also provided the model for the tapered side windows towards the rear. The nose of the vehicle is angled. The extensions of the front fenders protrude, the central part of the front fairing is pointed like an arrow. Inserted into the fenders are flip-up headlights. The hood is strongly subdivided: to the left and right of a bar painted in body color, it has openings for the radiators in black. On some, but not all, vehicles, there is another transversely oriented air intake opening in front of it. It was not included in the original design by the AMC designers. Some prototypes had round tail lights from the Fiat 850 at the rear. Richard Teague partially replaced them later with narrow, horizontally arranged tail lights, which were adopted from the Pontiac Firebird of the first or second series (AMX/3 No. 5). The large tailgate, which incorporates the engine cover and rear window, is hinged at the rear of the vehicle and is held open by two gas struts. A retractable wing was provided at the rear, but this was not realised on any of the prototypes. Diomante installed dummies on some, but not all, of the cars. However, at least one vehicle (No. 5) later received a functional rear wing during restoration work.

During 1969, AMC revised the design of the AMX/3 in some details. The rear overhang was slightly extended for technical reasons. In addition, the front bonnet in this version is shaped to cover the windscreen wipers located at the lower edge of the windscreen. The side windows in the doors are now one-piece, i.e. without front triangular windows. Diomante implemented these changes only on cars produced after AMC's withdrawal, and even here not on all of them. The changes are only found on the fourth and sixth AMX/3s and the subsequently completed seventh car, but not on the fifth prototype.

Drivetrain

Engine 

The AMX/3 are powered by AMC eight-cylinder V-engines mounted longitudinally in mid-engine position between the seats and the rear axle.

In the prototypes, these are the most powerful AMC engines of the time, which had been available from the factory in the muscle car Rebel The Machine since 1969. The engine block is made of gray cast iron. The forged crankshaft has five bearings. The engine has a central camshaft. The engine is short-stroke (bore × stroke: 105.79 × 90.77 mm); the displacement is 6383 cm³ (390 in³). The-Machine version has a four-barrel carburetor from Carter. The compression ratio is 10 : 1. The engine, tested under SAE J245/J1995, developed  at 5,100 min−1, and maximum torque at 430 lbf-ft (583 N-m) at 3,600 min−1. Measured with the standard DIN 70020 used in Europe at the time, the engine power corresponds to around 295 hp (217 kW). The water cooler, in the front of the car, is connected to two electric blowers. Coolers from Behr were installed during the testing process.

Series production of the 390 engine ended in 1970; thereafter AMC used a slightly enlarged, 6.6-liter (6573 cc, 401 in³), version in its muscle cars, with a gross power output of  according to SAE-J245/J1995 tests. In the literature, it is assumed that AMC would have equipped the AMX/3 with the new 401-cubic-inch version in the event of series production.

According to one source, the first prototype was also used on a trial basis in autumn 1969, with a BMW eight-cylinder engine from the M09 series (which was still under development) equipped and tested in Italy. The 4.5-liter (4,500 cc), which produces around  according to DIN 70020, is said to have been discussed at times as an alternative powerplant for the European version of the AMX/3.

Gearbox 
In most vehicles, the power transmission is provided by a gearbox made by Oto Melara, a subsidiary of the Italian state-owned IRI, which is primarily active in the armament sector. It has four gears that can be shifted manually and is united with the differential in one housing. At least one car has a manual five-speed transmission from ZF fitted instead. It is unclear why all cars were not equipped with the ZF transmission; the accounts in the documentation on the AMX/3 differ widely on this point. Some sources suggest that the ZF transmission was too expensive, others claim it could not have withstood the high torque of the AMC engine. Still others feel the ZF design did not fit well within the AMX/3's tight frame.

Driving performance 
The development of the AMX/3 was based on the management's target that the car had to reach a top speed of at least . The first prototype did not meet these requirements. With the original shape, the car had too much lift, so that it lifted at the front at high speeds. Initially, only  was achieved as top speed, although the engine had reserves for higher performance. Three months later, Giotto Bizzarrini and the racing driver Antonio Nieri tried out different front spoilers during test drives with the second prototype. This almost equalled that of a Ferrari 365 GTB/4 "Daytona". Nieri's fastest lap time in the AMX/3 was 1:56 min at Monza. The car thus equaled the values achieved a few years earlier by a Bizzarrini GT 5300.

Original vehicles 
In February 1969, Diomante began building the AMX/3 vehicles. Exactly how many cars were created, and which of them are to be regarded as original vehicles, has not been fully clarified.

In 1971, Giotto Bizzarrini spoke of three AMX/3s being completed and two other cars almost finished at the time of AMC's withdrawal. He did not mention any other cars or chassis. Deviating from this, most sources today assume not five, but six original AMX/3s, to which a number of younger cars, inconsistently estimated in detail, were added. This is based on the assumption that by the time AMC withdrew in the spring of 1970, Diomante had largely completed a tranche of five cars - including three road-ready prototypes - and had begun building five more chassis. Of the second tranche, at least one more car was completed shortly afterwards. Furthermore, at least three other cars are associated with the AMX/3, which are allegedly also based on the original chassis. These cars are not consistently recognized in the literature as original AMX/3. Another question is whether new chassis were still being produced after 1970.

The following vehicles can be distinguished:

Six originals

No. 1: First prototype 
The first prototype AMX/3, originally painted light green, was built in the spring of 1969. The car has no chassis number. Diomante still manufactured its essential parts in Livorno from March 1969, though Diomante's mechanics did not complete it until June 1969 at BMW in Munich. With it, BMW carried out a test programme that lasted from June to at least September 1969. At the end of 1969, the car went back to Diomante, where it was stored in incomplete condition (possibly as a parts donor for other AMX/3s) for a few years. Around 1973, AMC took over the chassis without gearbox and engine and imported it to the United States. There it passed through several collectors' hands; restoration of the now yellow-painted car began after another change of ownership in late 2019. It is currently owned by a Michigan resident, and was shown at the 2019 Muscle Car and Corvette Nationals show in Chicago, Illinois (where it won several awards).

No. 2: The "Red Monza Car" 

In the summer of 1969, the second prototype was built, bearing the chassis number WTDO 363 2/55/55. The car was referred to in AMC internal parlance as the "Red Monza Car". Individual older sources consider the Monza car to be the fourth prototype; however, this has since been disproved. Stylistically, the Monza car is largely, but not entirely, the same as the first prototype. Key exterior distinguishing features are large air vents recessed into the wings in front of the rear wheel arches to improve cooling and the horizontal air intake in the front fascia. Also new were the side position lights in the front and rear wings (Side Marker Lights), which the first prototype lacked in its original version. When designing the chassis of the second prototype, Bizzarrini took up the findings that the test drives with the first car had produced and implemented BMW's recommendations, at least in part.

From late 1969 (according to other sources: early 1970) the car went to BMW, where further tests were carried out. BMW certified that the car had significantly better torsional strength. In the spring of 1970, Bizzarrini organized speed tests with this chassis at the Autodromo Nazionale Monza. These tests are responsible for the unofficial designation of this vehicle. In February 1971, an Italian magazine tested the "Red Monza Car" in the Turin area.

Shortly afterwards, Diomante sold the car for US$6,000 to a collector who imported it into the US in November 1971. A sales document issued by Diomante incorrectly states the year of manufacture as 1967; this may be for tax reasons. After several changes of ownership, the car was restored in 1990 in California. Since then, it first appeared in red livery at classic car exhibitions. After a further revision in 2015, the car wears the contemporary AMC color "bittersweet orange". In January 2017, it sold for a price of $891,000 at a classic car auction. This was the highest price ever achieved for an AMC-branded car.

No. 3: Exhibit 
The third AMX/3 (chassis number A0M397X631524Y) was completed in early 1970. Stylistically, it corresponds completely to the first prototype from 1969. Like this, it has no side air intakes in the rear wings and also no horizontal air intake in the front bonnet. Consistent with the second prototype, however, are the side marker lights in the fenders. It is the first car in which the interior was also finished to the later series standard; the earlier cars initially had only provisional interiors.

In red livery, this car was photographed for publicity pictures in front of the Roman Colosseum in March 1970 and subsequently shown at press launches in Rome and New York and at the New York Auto Show in April 1970. AMC also featured the car in its Annual Report for 1970. In the following years, it remained with AMC. In 1978 it was taken over by Teague, whose family still owns it. The car is repeatedly on loan to various US museums.

No. 4: The "Turin Car" 
The fourth AMX/3 (chassis number WTDO 363 4/55/55) was referred to in AMC internal parlance as the "Torino Car". It was the first AMX/3 to feature the styling changes from autumn 1969 through late June 1970 - one-piece side windows, extended rear, and raised cowling. Diomante completed it after AMC's withdrawal of full project funding in the second half of 1970; however, it was assembled from components that had already been created in the winter of 1969-70. In October 1970, AMC exhibited car No. 4 at the Turin Motor Show. After the AMC exhibition, the term Bizzarrini Sciabola was discussed as a possible model designation. In 1971, the car was bought by a collector and imported to the United States.

No. 5: Direct to AMC 

The fifth car (chassis number A0M397X680492) was completed about the same time as the fourth - perhaps July to September 1970 around the time AMC withdrew full project funding. The car corresponds to the original, early AMC design, i.e. it has side triangular windows in the doors and the short rear. Unlike the second, third, and fourth cars, the fifth AMX/3 has no side marker lights.

It appears AMC imported the fifth car to the United States as late as 1973 with the first car and 28 transaxles. The car was complete and still in Italy by mid-late 1970 and appeared in the January 1971 issue of Italian magazine Quattroruote. In 1978 Teague bought the car and made stylistic changes to the taillights and began converting the dash gauges from European to American but left the gauges unfinished. Among other things, he had blacked-out second-series Pontiac Firebird taillights installed upside down, which were still on the car in 2019. In 2006, the car was restored and in the process, it received a black-painted front spoiler. The fifth car also had a retractable rear wing similar to cars 2, 3, and 4. Since 2006, the yellow-painted car has been shown at irregular intervals in the United States and Europe.

No. 6: The Sciabola 
The sixth car was running and drivable by the end of 1970, but not fully completed until early 1971. It too is assumed to be based on parts that had already been manufactured in 1970. Therefore, it is recognized as the original AMX/3. The body of the sixth AMX/3 has the 1969 modifications to the rear and side windows. However, like the first and third prototypes, the horizontal air intake in the front fairing is missing. The sixth car, unlike the earlier cars, has hardly any AMC accessories in the interior. Many components come from Fiat and Bertone instead. This applies to switches and instruments, but also to the double round rear lights (Fiat 850). The sixth AMX/3 still belongs to Salvatore Diomante. It was exhibited at the 1976 Turin Motor Show as the Bizzarrini Sciabola and photographed for a Sciabola brochure. This is the only car with the OTO-Melara transmission. In 1981, Richard Teague expressed the opinion that the sixth AMX/3 was the best car of the whole series: "a real gem".

Replicas on original chassis?

No. 7: A straggler 
The seventh chassis, which was supposedly built as early as 1970, remained unused for several years. Salvatore Diomante sold it in 1971 in incomplete condition to Giorgio Giordanengo, who had a business restoring classic Italian sports cars. Giordanengo completed the car with some delay, possibly as late as the 1980s. Stylistically, the body corresponds to that of the sixth vehicle. Diomante sold No. 7 in about 1992 to Belgian entrepreneur Roland D'Ieteren, the then managing director of the Brussels D'Ieteren Group. Over time, the car was correctly restored and completed around 1998.

No. 8: Iso Varedo 
The eighth chassis did not receive an AMX/3 body. From autumn 1971 onwards, Giotto Bizzarrini constructed the Show Car Iso Varedo for Iso Rivolta on the basis of this model, the plastic bodywork of which was based on the Lamborghini Countach and designed by Ercole Spada. Unlike the AMX/3 models, the Varedo has an eight-cylinder V-engine from Ford (Cleveland series), making the powertrain similar to Iso Rivolta's production cars. The Varedo debuted at the 1972 Turin Motor Show. It is doubtful whether Iso intended to mass-produce the Varedo. The car remained a one-off. It belongs to Iso's former owner Piero Rivolta, who has been exhibiting it in a museum in Florida for several years.

No. 9: AMX Spyder? 
Finally, the AMX/3 is associated with a Spyder that first appeared in Brussels in 2002. Most sources claim that the car is based on the ninth and last known original chassis of the AMX/3 series, having been sold by Bizzarrini to Giorgio Giordanengo, the owner of no. 7, sometime after 1971. Giordanengo then finished the Spyder body that was originally started by Bizzarrini, which has no stylistic references to the AMX/3 and instead resembles the earlier Bizzarrini P538. Unlike the regular AMX/3 vehicles, the Spyder originally received a 5.4L V8 engine from Chevrolet in the style of the P538. It was bought by Roland D'Ieteren in 1992, and by 1995 it was restored and completed with an AMC 390 engine. It has a ZF five-speed manual gearbox. However, some dispute the Spider's connection to the AMX/3. The reason given is that neither the wheelbase nor the track of the Spider match the AMX/3, however, no expert has proven these claims and neither of these can discount it being an original AMX/3 chassis.

Possible reasons for failure 
AMC did not publicly give a reason for abandoning AMX/3 at short notice. Most documentaries explain AMC's withdrawal for economic reasons. Apart from this, however, there are also numerous alternative explanations.

Overall economic situation at AMC 
AMC was subjected to the longest strike in the company's history in the autumn of 1969, which directly affected the launch of the new volume model Hornet. This resulted in serious liquidity problems at the turn of 1969/70, which affected all divisions of the company but had a particular impact on special projects.

Evaluation of the AMX/3 project 
Many authors consider the AMX/3 project itself to have been unprofitable. The AMX/3 could not be produced in Italy or Germany at the planned cost, and the advised sales price of US$10,000 to US$12,000 (which was already well above that of the De Tomaso Pantera) could not be achieved. Richard Teague, who had been desperate to realize the AMX/3 for emotional reasons, had kept the other corporate managers in the dark about the real costs of the project for too long.

Teague later confirmed the relevance of the cost development, but referred to specific occasion-related additional costs: The AMX/3 had been designed without consideration of the tightened US safety regulations, whose entry into force was already on the horizon at the beginning of the 1970s. Selling the AMX/3 in the US would have required extensive customization, which included the installation of stronger bumpers. Their costs could not have been borne by AMC.

Reaction by competitors 
In part, the discontinuation of the project is attributed to AMC's competitor Ford. In a direct comparison, Ford had recognized the superiority of the AMX/3 over its own Pantera and thereupon induced the economically ailing AMC group to forego production of the Pantera competitor in return for a monetary payment.

Other speculations involve Karmann and Volkswagen: Because the production of the AMC Javelin at Karmann ended almost at the same time as the AMX/3 project, an intervention of the Volkswagen Group is partly suspected, which wanted to prevent a commitment of Karmann to AMC and thus secure production capacities for its own models.

Insolvency of Bizzarini 
Finally, the insolvency of Automobili Bizzarrini is also cited as a reason for abandoning the AMX/3 project: Giotto Bizzarrini had significant tax debts from the time his GT 5300 sports car was imported into the US. According to one assumption, AMC had feared being held liable for Giotto Bizzarrini's debts by the US tax authorities in the event of a long-term business relationship with him.

Revivals after AMC withdrawal: Bizzarrini Sciabola 
After AMC withdrew from the project in July 1970, there were several attempts to revive the AMX/3 as the Bizzarrini AMX/3 or Bizzarrini Sciabola. The details of this are very uncertain; various documents fundamentally contradict each other.

1970: 30 Bizzarrinis without AMC? 
What is certain is that in the summer of 1970 AMC was prepared to let Bizzarrini build - possibly in the sense of compensation - about 30 AMX/3s, 20 of which were to be sold in Europe under the Bizzarrini brand, while 10 others were to be supplied to AMC. Subsequently, Bizzarrini exhibited an AMX/3 on its own stand at the Turin Motor Show in October 1970. This was the Torino Car called the fourth AMX/3. Contemporary sources show that Bizzarrini was already using the model name Sciabola (English: Sabre) at this stage.

Whether Bizzarrini and Diomante actually started series production or at least planned to do so is unclear; the sources on this are contradictory. Giotto Bizzarrini explained that he had not accepted AMC's offer to produce the AMX/3 on his own responsibility because he had "not had the courage" or because he did not want to produce the AMX/3 himself, the memory of Automobili Bizzarrini's insolvency was still present. If this is true, then beyond the six original vehicles, no more AMX/3-bodied cars were produced from 1971 onwards. In fundamental disagreement, other sources speak of Diomante actually having "more or less completed" "a few" more cars after AMC's exit in the summer of 1970; in some cases production of nine more cars is assumed. However, at the beginning of 1971, AMC had refused the initially promised delivery of technical components for these cars without giving any reasons and had demanded the scrapping of all AMX/3 models. Diomante had destroyed the nine cars built from the summer of 1970 onwards, but not the original prototypes he had built up to 1970. Still others believe Diomante is still hiding some more AMX/3 bodies.

1976: Bizzarrini and Oto Melara: The Sciabola 
1976 Giotto Bizzarrini exhibited a sports car called the Sciabola at the Turin Motor Show and published a sales brochure for it. The car presented was the sixth chassis of the AMX/3, which had been completed by Diomante in early 1971 and had been kept in Turin ever since. No further development over the original AMX/3 versions was apparent. The exhibition of the Sciabola was largely financed by Oto Melara and had the primary purpose of presenting the car as an advertising medium for Oto Melara gearboxes. Giotto Bizzarrini announced to the Italian press that the Sciabola would be handcrafted to order at a price of $23,800  However, production did not materialize. Chassis No. 6 still belongs to Salvatore Diomante.

Influences of the AMX/3 on later AMC models 

The lines of the AMX/3 influenced the design of some of AMC's later production models. This is especially true of the distinctive hip sweep in the rear wings.

For the 1973 model year, AMC first introduced the three-door hatchback version of the Hornet compact model, whose rear wings quoted the hip sweep of the AMX/3 in a toned-down form. The rear side windows taper to a point. In autumn 1973, the second edition of the Matador Coupé made its debut. Designed under the direction of Richard Teague, the hatchback coupe has AMX/3-inspired lines on the rear wings, which are more widely displayed than the Hornet. Also comparable are the rear side windows, which were also tapered in the original design, but in later years were covered by a vinyl cover on some versions. The US magazine Car and Driver awarded the Matador coupe in November 1973 as the best-designed car of the 1974 model year.

Ratings 
Although the AMX/3 did not reach the mass production stage, it is not considered a failure today. Many - including Richard Teague himself - consider the AMX/3 the best design Teague realised at AMC. For his part, Giotto Bizzarrini believes that the AMX/3 is his best design. In some quarters, it has been suggested that mass production of the AMX/3 could have brought AMC many new customers and possibly saved the corporation. In 2017, Thomas Glatch of SportsCarMarket would say:
"This car was a milestone. It was born out of a unique project that brought together some of the brightest minds in the automotive world of the late 1960s and 1970s."

Inspirations and revivals 
The California-registered company Sciabola Inc. has been trying to develop a replica of the AMX/3 since 2007. The company has now produced several bodyshells directly derived from the plastic model of the AMX/3 shown in 1969. However, until 2019, there was a lack of funding to develop the technology. There is no record of any sales of the new AMX/3 bodies to date.

Richard Teague's son Jeff, who is also an industrial designer and has worked for Ford, among others, designed the AMX/4 concept car and in 2010, the AMX/5. Both vehicles are intended as homages to the AMX/3 and are said to be an evolution of its design concept. In both cases, a plastic model was built; however, series production was not intended.

Technical data

Further reading 
 Wolfgang Blaube: Vorstellung und Entwicklungsgeschichte des AMC AMX/3. In: Oldtimer Markt Nr. 4, April 2011
 Marc Cranswick: The Cars of American Motors: An Illustrated History. McFarland, 2011, 
 Winston Goodfellow: Giottos Meisterstück. Octane Magazin, Magazine Mai 2017, P. 64 ff.
 Larry G. Mitchell: AMC Muscle Cars: Muscle Car Color History. MotorBooks International, 
 Philippe Olczyk: Bizzarrini & Diomante. The Official History. 3. Vol 2017,
 Alessandro Sannia: Enciclopedia dei carrozzieri italiani. Società Editrice Il Cammello, 2017, 
 Halwart Schrader, Georg Amtmann: Italienische Sportwagen. Stuttgart 1999,

Notes

References

External links 

Video Sciabola by Giotto Bizzarrini
AMX390.com
Website for AMC AMX/3
AMX-perience.com
JavelinAMX.com
American Motors OwnersClub for 1958–1987 AMCs

1970s cars
AMX
Coupés
Grand tourers
Rear mid-engine, rear-wheel-drive vehicles
Muscle cars
Cars introduced in 1968